Reno may refer to the following places in the U.S state of Michigan:

 Reno Township, Michigan, Iosco County
 A former post office and railroad station in Wright Township, Ottawa County, Michigan